Gábor Szakácsi, also known as Gabi Hun or Gabor Hun, is a Hungarian-born American rock guitarist and vocalist, best known as the frontman of Seattle punk group Sledgeback. He fronted C.A.F.B., one of the most influential Hungarian punk bands of the 1990s, with whom he released six full-length albums between 1993 and 2017. After leaving Hungary, Hun started Sledgeback in 2004 and released several albums with the group. His distinct voice became the trademark of Sledgeback.

Career 

Hun rose to fame in Hungary and its surrounding areas with his band C.A.F.B. following the success of their 1997 album "Zanza" which launched the group into the country's mainstream. Despite its success the band was unable to work together due to Gabor Hun's drug related problems. He has left the country after the recording sessions of their 1999 album and formed Sledgeback years later in Seattle. Szakácsi started Seattle rock group "The Scoffs" with former members of locally successful punk bands in 2019.

Discography

Sledgeback 
36206 2016
Land of the freak 2014
7 years like a broken record 2012
3 of a kind 2012 (Sliver records/New art express) CD
Bite the bullet 2010 (Sliver records/New art express) CD
Reality Bites-Sledgeback-Foreign Legion Split 2010 (Sliver records) CD
Perception Becomes Reality 2007 (Rebellion records) LP, CD
Perception Becomes Reality 2006 (Sliver records) CD
People's choice 2004 (Sliver records)
A scavenger for life 2004 (EP)

Compilations 
Zombie pit compilation 2011 (PIG Records) CD
Shut the f*** up and listen IV. 2011 (PIG Records) 7" Vinyl
We are the underground 2007 (Rebellion records) CD
Music is stupid. We like noise! 2005 (W.A.G.T.E.Y.) CD
Punks and pints 3 2007 (Sliver records) CD
Punks and pints 2 2005 (Sliver records) CD
Punks and pints 1 2004 (Sliver records) CD

The Scoffs (English) 
Talk Is Cheap... Here's the Scoffs 2020 (New art express) CD
Bridge the gap 2021
The lonely ones 2022

C.A.F.B. (Hungarian) 
C.A.F.B. self-titled 2017 (Sliver records) CD
EP'17 2017 (Sliver records) CD
Naiv 2004 (Aurora records) CD
Subkontakt 2001 (Edge records) CD
Minden-hato 1999 (Edge records) CD
Zanza, 1997 (Premier art records) CD
Ne bizz senkiben 1993 (Trottel records)

Tapes 
Klubbang 1998 (Live recordings and demos)
Archiv 1992 (Live 1992 Dec.19 with Tankcsapda)
Utcastilus 1992 (The first release)

Compilations 
Pajtas daloljunk 4. 1993 Trottel records (Various artists)
Sokk&Roll 1998 (Various artists)
Let the hammer fall 2001 (Sampler compilation/Metal hammer magazine Hungary-Issue#134)

Videos 
C.A.F.B. - "Engedj be!" video 1997 from Dailymotion 
Sledgeback – "Werewolf Love" video 2006 by Art Reynolds
Gabor Hun in Punk rock circus with Civet 2006
Gabor Hun in Punk rock circus trailer 2006
C.A.F.B. - "Diktátor" (Written by Gabor Szakacsi) 2002

Notable contributions 

At its beginnings Szakácsi was a contributing member of the Hungarian band Brains, which is a successful pop music group today, regularly appearing some of the most prominent festivals of Europe.
In the spring of 2011 Gabor Hun interviewed Los Angeles punk rock singer Doug Dagger of The Generators and Canadian psychobilly musician Big John Bates (Former member of Annihilator) for the Hungarian music magazine Totalrock. The staff of the magazine opened a full section for Hun, called "vs.Gabihun". Gábor Szakácsi joined Seattle based punk group The Scoffs as guitarist in 2019.

Equipment 
Gabor Hun uses
Soldano Hot Rod 50 amplifier head
Gibson Les Paul electric guitar
Fender 100 amplifier head
Musiclord cabinet
Ashdown cabinet
Hohner L-75 guitar with EMG active pickup
Sennheiser ew 172 G3 wireless system
Hun known for using only 5 strings on the instrument (E.A.D.G.B with no E1).

Personal life 
He acquired US citizenship in 2008 and lives in Seattle with his California native wife Heidi whom he married in September 2004. He stated in an interview that he does not consume recreational drugs or alcoholic beverages. Gábor Szakácsi is the eldest son of the Hungarian film producer Lajos Szakacsi.

References

External links 

Interview with Gabor Hun
Interju with Gabor Hun (Hungarian)
Real magazine articles of Gabor Hun's C.A.F.B.
Aardschok magazine interview with Gabor Hun (July 2007)
Zeneforum interview with Gabor Hun (November 2000)

American punk rock guitarists
Living people
American people of Hungarian descent
American punk rock bass guitarists
American punk rock singers
Musicians from Seattle
Singers from Washington (state)
American rock guitarists
American male bass guitarists
Guitarists from Washington (state)
Year of birth missing (living people)
American punk rock musicians
American male musicians
Hungarian musicians